TASP may refer to:
www.theasp.org.uk, The Association of Safeguarding Partners - a membership association that promotes the safeguarding of children and vulnerable people in England 
Telluride Association Summer Program, American educational programme
Treatment as prevention (TasP)
Transcription Application Service Provider
Trade Advance Service Provider
Tasp, a device in the Known Space short stories written by author Larry Niven which remotely mimics the effects of wireheading
Tasp, a village in the Panjgur District or Balochistan, Pakistan